The  generalized Helmholtz theorem  is the multi-dimensional generalization of the Helmholtz theorem which is valid only in one dimension. The generalized Helmholtz theorem reads as follows.

Let

be the canonical coordinates of a s-dimensional Hamiltonian system, and let

be the Hamiltonian function, where

,

is the kinetic energy and

is the potential energy which depends on a parameter .
Let the hyper-surfaces of constant energy in the 2s-dimensional phase space of the system be metrically indecomposable and let  denote time average.

,

,

,

Then:

Remarks 
The thesis of this theorem of classical mechanics reads exactly as the heat theorem of thermodynamics. This fact shows that thermodynamic-like relations exist between certain mechanical quantities in multidimensional ergodic systems. This in turn allows to define the "thermodynamic state" of a multi-dimensional ergodic mechanical system, without the requirement that the system be composed of a large number of degrees of freedom. In particular the temperature  is given by twice the time average of the kinetic energy per degree of freedom, and the entropy  by the logarithm of the phase space volume enclosed by the constant energy surface (i.e. the so-called volume entropy).

References

Further reading 
Helmholtz, H., von (1884a). Principien der Statik monocyklischer Systeme. Borchardt-Crelle’s Journal für die reine und angewandte Mathematik, 97, 111–140 (also in Wiedemann G. (Ed.) (1895) Wissenschafltliche Abhandlungen. Vol. 3 (pp. 142–162, 179–202). Leipzig: Johann Ambrosious Barth).
Helmholtz, H., von (1884b). Studien zur Statik monocyklischer Systeme. Sitzungsberichte der Kö niglich Preussischen Akademie der Wissenschaften zu Berlin, I, 159–177 (also in Wiedemann G. (Ed.) (1895) Wissenschafltliche Abhandlungen. Vol. 3 (pp. 163–178). Leipzig: Johann Ambrosious Barth).
Boltzmann, L. (1884). Über die Eigenschaften monocyklischer und anderer damit verwandter Systeme.Crelles Journal, 98: 68–94 (also in Boltzmann, L. (1909). Wissenschaftliche Abhandlungen (Vol. 3,pp. 122–152), F. Hasenöhrl (Ed.). Leipzig. Reissued New York: Chelsea, 1969).
Khinchin, A. I. (1949). Mathematical foundations of statistical mechanics. New York: Dover.
Gallavotti, G. (1999). Statistical mechanics: A short treatise. Berlin: Springer.
Campisi, M. (2005) On the mechanical foundations of thermodynamics: The generalized Helmholtz theorem Studies in History and Philosophy of Modern Physics 36: 275–290

Theorems in mathematical physics
Theorems in dynamical systems